Roberto Saraiva Fagundes (born February 5, 1983) is a Brazilian professional football midfielder, who is currently playing for Tarxien Rainbows FC.In Malta He is known as the Rainbows' little Brazilian star.

He is more common known as Saraiva.

References

External links
 Herfølge profile 
futpedia profile
AC Management profile

1983 births
Living people
Brazilian footballers
Sport Club Internacional players
Grêmio Foot-Ball Porto Alegrense players
CR Flamengo footballers
Clube de Regatas Brasil players
Grêmio Barueri Futebol players
Herfølge Boldklub players
HB Køge players
Danish Superliga players
Brazilian expatriate footballers
Expatriate men's footballers in Denmark
Association football midfielders